Arbo may refer to:

Places 
 Arbo, Pontevedra, a municipality in Galicia, Spain
 Arbo, Mardin (Turkish: Taşköy), a Syriac village in Turkey
 Arbo, Georgia, a village in Georgia

People 
 Aribo of Austria (c. 850 – 909), or Arbo, margrave of the March of Pannonia
 Arbeo of Freising (c. 723 – 784), or Arbo, Bishop of Freising
 Manuel Arbó (1898–1973), Spanish film actor
 Miquel Asins Arbó (1918–1996), Spanish composer
 Peter Nicolai Arbo (1831–1892), Norwegian painter
 Peter Nicolaj Arbo (1657–1827), Norwegian-Danish merchant and landowner
 Rani Arbo, American bluegrass musician
 Sebastià Juan Arbó (1902–1984), Catalan novelist and playwright
 Verónica Arbo (born 1968), Argentine sprint canoer
 Bob Arbogast (1927–2009), nicknamed "Arbo", American radio broadcaster, voice actor, and television host.

Other uses 
 Arbo, Japanese name for Ekans and Arbok, a fictional species in the Pokémon franchise
 Arbo Mountain, a mountain in Lincoln County, Montana

See also 
 Arbós